Bellevue is an Amerindian Kalina village in the commune of Iracoubo, French Guiana.

Overview
Bellevue is an Amerindian village on Route nationale 1, at a distance of eight kilometres from Iracoubo. The inhabitants originally lived in Grosse Roche on the Atlantic Ocean. In the 1950s, they were resettled in Bellevue. In the village, there are a couple of shops, however the nearest accommodations are in Iracoubo.  The village has a school.

The Kali'nas (also known as Galibis) in Bellevue still maintain some of their traditions (fishing, danses).

In 1997, Cécile Kouyouri became the first female Amerindian chief in French Guiana. In 2018, the village was allocated 1,000 hectares of communal land.

References

External links
Pictures of Bellevue 

Indigenous villages in French Guiana
Iracoubo
Villages in French Guiana